Karim Abdel Aziz (born August 17, 1975) is an Egyptian actor. He is the son of instructor Mohammad Abdul Aziz and nephew of film director Omar Abdel Aziz

Early life 
Karim Abdel Aziz was born August 17, 1975, in Agouza, Giza, the older brother of two children. Abdel Aziz was raised by a director with great heritage in the Egyptian cinema, as he is the son of the great director Mohamed Abd El Aziz , while his mother was an employee at the mass culture center.  This is artistic bringing up influenced him choosing his acting career as he was already familiar with the nature of the business. Abdel Aziz studied in a French School Collège De La Salle in Cairo and graduated from it. Abdel Aziz joined the high institute of cinema in 1994, to start a whole different life since. He graduated from the directing department in 1997 and worked as assistant director for a short period where he was tempted by the sensation of being in front of the camera instead of behind it. This is when he decided to switch to acting instead of directing, until he got his chance in acting with the director Sherif Arafa who introduced him for the first time. Then When Samira Ahmed choose Abdel Aziz for his role in the TV drama " Emraa mn zaman el hob" it was his real kick off as a true artist with a real talent and great sense of humor that he was receiving several offers until he got his leading role in front of Mona Zaki and Hala Shiha and Ahmed Helmy in "Leeh khalletny ahebbak"

Career

Filmography

References

External links 

 Official Website
 اغنية الغزالة رايقة

1975 births
Egyptian male film actors
Living people
Egyptian Muslims
Male actors from Cairo
Egyptian comedians